Grand-Couronne is a commune in the Seine-Maritime department in the Normandy region in northern France.

Geography
The A13 autoroute passes through the southern section of the commune's territory.

Heraldry

Population

Twin towns
 Seelze, Germany
 Velten, Germany

See also
Communes of the Seine-Maritime department

References

External links

 

Communes of Seine-Maritime